Gelechia tribalanota is a moth of the family Gelechiidae. It was described by Edward Meyrick in 1935. It is found in southern China.

References

Moths described in 1935
Gelechia